Eto! Baš hoću! (trans. There! I Will!) is the third studio album by Yugoslav rock band Bijelo Dugme, released in 1976.

Eto! Baš hoću! was the band's first album which was not recorded by the band's default lineup. It did not feature the bass guitarist Zoran Redžić, the drummer Ipe Ivandić and the keyboardist Vlado Pravdić, as all three were serving their mandatory army stints at the time. It was the band's first album to feature keyboardist Laza Ristovski, and the band's only album to feature Milić Vukašinović on drums.

In 1998, the album was polled as the 31st on the list of 100 greatest Yugoslav rock and pop albums in the book YU 100: najbolji albumi jugoslovenske rok i pop muzike (YU 100: The Best Albums of Yugoslav Pop and Rock Music). In 2015, the album was pronounced the 36th on the list of 100 greatest Yugoslav albums published by Croatian edition of Rolling Stone.

Background
During 1976, Bijelo Dugme bass guitarist Zoran Redžić, drummer Ipe Ivandić, and keyboardist Vlado Pravdić all faced hiatus from the band due to receiving call-ups to serve their respective mandatory Yugoslav People's Army (JNA) stints. Each of them thus got temporary replacements: Formula 4 leader Ljubiša Racić came in place of Redžić, Bregović's former Kodeksi bandmate Milić Vukašinović took over Ivandić's spot, and Pravdić got replaced by Laza Ristovski whose arrival from Smak (Bijelo Dugme's main competitors at the time) received extensive coverage in the Yugoslav press.

The band worked on and prepared for the recording of the album in the village Borike in Eastern Bosnia, in which they previously worked on their previous studio album, Šta bi dao da si na mom mjestu. The album's working title was Sve se dijeli na dvoje, na tvoje i moje (Everything Is Split in Two, Yours and Mine), after a poem by poet and lyricist Duško Trifunović. Bregović did not manage to write the music on the poem lyrics (the lyrics were later used in a song recorded by Jadranka Stojaković), so he intended to name the album Hoću bar jednom da budem blesav (For Once I Want to Be Crazy), but Jugoton editors did not like the title. The album was eventually titled Eto! Baš hoću! (There! I Will!). The album featured eight tracks: hard rock-oriented title track, "Izgledala je malo čudno u kaputu žutom krojenom bez veze" and "Dede bona, sjeti se, de tako ti svega", blues rock-oriented "Ne dese se takve stvari pravome muškarcu", folk-oriented "Slatko li je ljubit' tajno", simple tune "Ništa mudro" (featuring lyrics written by Duško Trifunović) and two ballads, symphonic-oriented "Sanjao sam noćas da te nemam" and simpler "Loše vino" (written by Bregović and singer-songwriter Arsen Dedić and originally recorded by singer Zdravko Čolić).

The album was, as Šta bi dao da si na mom mjestu, recorded in London and produced by Neil Harrison. On the recording, the bass guitar was played by the band's vocalist, Željko Bebek, as Ljubiša Racić was hired only as a touring musician. The album was released on 20 December 1976.

"Dedicated to soldiers Zoran Redžić, Ipe Ivandić and Vlado Pravdić" was written on the album back cover.

Track listing
All songs written by Goran Bregović, except where noted.

Personnel
Goran Bregović – guitar
Željko Bebek – vocals, bass guitar
Milić Vukašinović – drums
Laza Ristovski – keyboard

Additional personnel
Benjamin Newson – alto saxophone
Raphael Ravenscroft – tenor, baritone and alto saxophone
Alf Waite Jr. – trombone
David Defries – trumpet
Joy Yates – backing vocals
Stevie Lange – backing vocals
Val Stokes – backing vocals
Neil Harrison – producer
Jon Kelly – recorded by
Jon Walls – recorded by
Chris Blair – mastered by
Dragan S. Stefanović – design
Veljko Despot – photography

Reception
The album's main hits were "Izgledala je malo čudno u kaputu žutom krojenom bez veze", "Loše vino", "Dede, bona, sjeti se, de, tako ti svega", "Slatko li je ljubit' tajno" and "Sanjao sam noćas da te nemam".

In a review, critic Darko Glavan stated that Eto! Baš hoću! is a "magnificent record, without any doubt the best thing that Bregović has offered to his fans by now".

Legacy

The album was polled in 1998 as the 31st on the list of 100 greatest Yugoslav rock and pop albums in the book YU 100: najbolji albumi jugoslovenske rok i pop muzike (YU 100: The Best Albums of Yugoslav Pop and Rock Music).

In 2015, the album was pronounced the 36th on the list of 100 greatest Yugoslav albums published by Croatian edition of Rolling Stone.

The song "Sanjao sam noćas da te nemam" was polled in 2000 as the 31st on Rock Express Top 100 Yugoslav Rock Songs of All Times list. The song "Loše vino" was polled in 2006 as the 34th on B92 Top 100 Yugoslav songs list.

Covers
Yugoslav pop trio Aska recorded a Bijelo Dugme songs medley on their 1982 album Disco Rock, featuring, among other Bijelo Dugme songs, "Izgledala je malo čudno u kaputu žutom krojenom bez veze".
Serbian and Yugoslav rock band Revolveri recorded a cover of "Ništa mudro" on their 1990 EP Sever i jug (North and South), with Dušan Prelević on vocals as guest.
Bosnian and Yugoslav pop rock band Regina recorded a cover of "Izgledala je malo čudno u kaputu žutom krojenom bez veze" on their 1991 album Ljubav nije za nas (Love Is Not for Us).
Croatian singer-songwriter and former Azra leader Branimir "Džoni" Štulić released a cover of "Sanjao sam noćas da te nemam" on his official YouTube channel in 2012.

References

Eto! Baš hoću! at Discogs

External links
Eto! Baš hoću! at Discogs

1976 albums
Bijelo Dugme albums
Jugoton albums